Martin Nedić (Tolisa 1 April 1810 – 26 April 1895) was a Bosnian poet. He wrote mostly under the pseudonym "Stari Ilir iz Bosne" (Old Illyrian from Bosnia) and "fra Martin Nedić Bošnjačanin" (Martin Nedić the Bosniak)

Nedić attended school in Tolisa under fra Bono Benić Jr. He went on to gymnasium in Kraljeva Sutjeska and studied philosophy and theology in Subotica, Szolnok, Agrija, Gyöngyös and Vác.

As a student he was drawn to the ideas of the Illyrian Movement which he soon adopted and incorporated into his own writing. He wrote historical poems as well as commemorative, with eventful and sacramental contents. Nedić also wrote memos from Bosnia, compiled reports about the state of Catholic schools in Bosnia, and collected and published historical materials and national treasures.

Works
 Razgovor koga vile ilirkinje imadoše u pramalitje, 
 Pokret godine 1848. i 1849.,  
 Pjesma…Franji Josipu I (1852.), 
 Regula et testamentum S.P. S. Francisci (1854.), 
 Shematismus almae misionariae provinciae Bosnae Argentinae (1855.), 
 Starine bosanske  
 Kitica od devet u raznih zgodah ubranih cvjetova (1875.), 
 Ratovanje slovinskoga naroda proti Turcima godine 1875. -1877. (1881.), 
 Pjesma o ulazu cesarove vojske u Bosnu (1881.), 
 Život fra Marijana Šunjića (1883.), 
 Stanje redodržave  Bosne Srebrene (1884.), 
 Poraz baša a zavedenje nizama u Bosni (ep, 1844.), 
 Razgovor vilah ilirkinjah u pramalitje godine 1841,
 Glas redodržave Bosne Srebrene (ep), 
 Pjesmotvorni spisi, 
 Zapamćenja (rukopisi).

1810 births
1895 deaths
Bosnia and Herzegovina writers
Bosnia and Herzegovina poets
Bosnia and Herzegovina Roman Catholics
People of the Illyrian movement
Croats of Bosnia and Herzegovina
19th-century poets